Fawzi Salloukh (born 1931) is a Lebanese politician, who served as Minister of Foreign Affairs from 19 July 2005 to 2009.

Early life and education
Salloukh was born into a Shiite family in Qmatiye, Aley, Lebanon, in 1931. He graduated from the American University of Beirut in 1954 with a diploma in political Science.

Career and alliances
Salloukh is a Lebanese career diplomat who served as ambassador to Sierra Leone (1964–1971), Nigeria (1978–1985), Algeria (1985–1987), Austria (1990–1994), and Belgium (1994–1995). He also served as Lebanon's ambassador to the European Union. At the beginning of the 1970s, he was director of economic affairs at the ministry of foreign affairs. He retired after his tenure as ambassador to Belgium. Then he worked as the secretary general of the Islamic University in Lebanon from 1998 to 2005.

In July 2005, he was appointed foreign minister to the cabinet led by then prime minister Fouad Siniora. Salloukh was proposed by Hizbollah to this post when Hizbollah's own candidates for the post were not accepted due to international pressure. He was a moderate figure, and the Amal movement endorsed his appointment. He resigned from office with other four Shiite ministers in November 2006. The reason for their resignation was Siniora's eagerness to sign the UN draft plan for the foundation of the Special Tribunal for Lebanon, which would search the assassination of Rafik Hariri, who was killed on 14 February 2005.

Salloukh was again appointed to the same post in the cabinet headed by Fouad Siniora in July 2008. His tenure lasted until 2009, and he was succeeded by Ali Shami.

Personal life
Salloukh is married to Hind Basma and has three children.

See also
Lebanese government of July 2005
Lebanese government of July 2008

References

1931 births
Living people
American University of Beirut alumni
Ambassadors of Lebanon to Sierra Leone
Ambassadors of Lebanon to Nigeria
Ambassadors of Lebanon to Algeria
Ambassadors of Lebanon to Austria
Ambassadors of Lebanon to Belgium
Government ministers of Lebanon
Foreign ministers of Lebanon
Lebanese Shia Muslims
People from Aley District
Ambassadors of Lebanon to the European Union